Madanapalle mandal is one of the 66 mandals in Annamayya district of the Indian state of Andhra Pradesh. It is under the administration of Madanapalle  revenue division and the headquarters are located at Madanapalle. The mandal is bounded by Kurabalakota, GurramKonda, Valmikipuram, Nimmanapalle, B. Kothakota, Punganur, Ramasamudram and the State of Karnataka.

Towns and villages 

 census, the mandal has 23 villages.

The settlements in the mandal are listed below:

Note: M-Municipality

See also 
 List of mandals in Andhra Pradesh

References 

Mandals in Annamayya district